The 5 '''arrondissements of the Puy-de-Dôme department are:

 Arrondissement of Ambert, (subprefecture: Ambert) with 58 communes. The population of the arrondissement was 27,606 in 2016.
 Arrondissement of Clermont-Ferrand, (prefecture of the Puy-de-Dôme department: Clermont-Ferrand) with 74 communes. The population of the arrondissement was 354,048 in 2016.
 Arrondissement of Issoire, (subprefecture: Issoire) with 133 communes. The population of the arrondissement was 77,561 in 2016.
 Arrondissement of Riom, (subprefecture: Riom) with 155 communes. The population of the arrondissement was 135,164 in 2016.
 Arrondissement of Thiers, (subprefecture: Thiers) with 44 communes. The population of the arrondissement was 56,321 in 2016.

History

In 1800 the arrondissements of Clermont-Ferrand, Ambert, Issoire, Riom and Thiers were established. The arrondissement of Ambert was disbanded in 1926, and restored in 1942. 

The borders of the arrondissements of Puy-de-Dôme were modified in January 2017:
 three communes from the arrondissement of Clermont-Ferrand to the arrondissement of Ambert
 21 communes from the arrondissement of Clermont-Ferrand to the arrondissement of Issoire
 17 communes from the arrondissement of Clermont-Ferrand to the arrondissement of Riom
 four communes from the arrondissement of Clermont-Ferrand to the arrondissement of Thiers
 one commune from the arrondissement of Riom to the arrondissement of Clermont-Ferrand
 three communes from the arrondissement of Thiers to the arrondissement of Riom

References

Puy-de-Dome